The 1952 United States Senate election in Missouri was held on November 4, 1952. 

Incumbent Republican Senator James P. Kem ran for re-election to a second term in office, but was defeated by Secretary of the Air Force Stuart Symington.

Republican primary

Candidates
Herman G. Grosby
 James P. Kem, incumbent Senator since 1947
 William McKinley Thomas, perennial candidate

Results

Democratic primary

Candidates
 John A. Johnson, State Senator from Ellington
 Stuart Symington, U.S. Secretary of the Air Force
 J.E. "Buck" Taylor, Missouri Attorney General

Results

General election

Results

See also 
 1952 United States Senate elections

References 

1952
Missouri
United States Senate